Sámuel Jósika may refer to:

Sámuel Jósika (chancellor) (1805–1860), a chancellor of Transylvania
Sámuel Jósika (politician) (1848–1923), a Hungarian and Romanian politician